Lodge Park may refer to:

 Lodge Park, Worcestershire
 Lodge Park and Sherborne Estate